Mary Boyd may refer to:
 Mary D. R. Boyd (1809–?), American author of children's books
 Mary Syme Boyd (1910–1997), Scottish artist and sculptor
 Mary Boyd (mistress), 15th-century mistress of King James IV of Scotland
 Mary Nolan (artist) (née Boyd; 1926–2016), Australian ceramicist, painter and photographer